Julius Ellsberry (August 22, 1921 – December 7, 1941) was an American killed during the Japanese attack on Pearl Harbor. He was the first Alabamian killed in World War II, and one of the first Americans to die in the Pacific during World War II. He was killed while aboard.

Early life
Ellsberry was born in Birmingham, Alabama and was a 1938 graduate of Parker High School.

Military career

He and 413 other crewmen were killed aboard the battleship. He was awarded a posthumous Purple Heart in honor of his sacrifice.

A Navy press release followed shortly after the announcement of Ellsberry's death describing the heroism of another black seaman, then unidentified. Mess Attendant Second Class Doris Miller assumed control of a deck gun on the  after the gunner was killed and helped defend the ship. Media reports at the time often credited Ellsberry with Miller's heroism and the misidentification still sometimes persists.

Legacy

The Birmingham World labeled Ellsberry "the Crispus Attucks of World War II".<ref name=Cronenberg>Cronenberg, Allen (2003) "Forth to the Mighty Conflict: Alabama and World War II. Tuscaloosa: University of Alabama Press. p. 12. </ref> Birmingham's Black community raised over $300,000 in war bond purchases toward the completion of a B-24 Liberator named The Spirit of Ellsberry''.

Birmingham's Ellsberry Park near Finley Boulevard north of downtown was dedicated in his honor in 1979. A marker honoring Ellsberry's sacrifice has also been erected in Kelly Ingram Park, which is named for fellow Navy veteran and Birmingham native Osmond Kelly Ingram, the first American killed in World War I.

References

External links
 Miller, Richard E. (January 8, 2008) "Julius Ellsberry". The Historical Marker Database
 Curry, Dodson M. (January 31, 2010) "Ellsberry Memorial Park". The Historical Marker Database

1921 births
1941 deaths
Military personnel from Birmingham, Alabama
United States Navy personnel killed in World War II
Deaths by Japanese airstrikes during the attack on Pearl Harbor
People who died at sea
Deaths by airstrike during World War II
United States Navy sailors
African Americans in World War II